The Battle of the Sacramento River was a battle that took place on February 28, 1847 during the Mexican–American War. About fifteen miles north of Chihuahua, Mexico at the crossing of the river Sacramento, American forces numbering less than 1,000 men defeated a superior Mexican army which led to the occupation of Chihuahua.

Background
On the 8 February, Colonel Alexander Doniphan's force of 924 soldiers and 300 civilians left El Paso del Norte for Chihuahua, despite learning that John E. Wool had abandoned his march there.  Major Samuel Owens had the civilians formed into a battalion along with the caravan of 312 wagons. On 25 February, they reached the Laguna de Encenillas, where they learned of the Mexican defenses prepared for them.

Governor Trias had built up a force under the command of General Jose A. Heredia, consisting of 1,200 cavalry (Gen. Garcia Conde: Vera Cruz Dragoons, Durango & Chihuahua Lancers), 1,500 infantry (Chihuahua Activos), 119 artillerymen (10 field guns & 6 culverins) and 1000 rancheros.  They had constructed a redoubt near the Hacienda Sacramento where the El Paso road crosses the river, and at Hacienda el Torreon two miles to the west.

At sunrise on February 28, the last day of February, the Americans took up the line of march and formed the whole wagon train into four columns with the artillery and mounted men in the middle.  Three companies screened the front. When the Americans arrived within sight of the Mexican defenses, Doniphan made a reconnaissance of the enemy positions.  Twenty-three separate works had been dug for twelve 4- to 9-pounders and nine lighter pieces.

Battle
Doniphan used his cavalry to screen the movement of his force parallel to the Arroyo Seco and to the right and out of range of the Mexican artillery.  Doniphan formed the wagons into a fort after crossing the gully onto a plateau, and Major Meriwether Lewis Clark, Sr.'s guns fired onto General Garcia Conde's lancers, forcing them to flee.

Doniphan's men approached the southernmost Mexican earthworks, held by Heredia's best troops. Doniphan ordered Capt. Richard H. Weightman's twin howitzers to the front accompanied by Capt. Reid's force of mounted cavalry men.  Major Owens was killed in the charge, but Missourians took the fort.

Trias attempted a counterattack but his lancers were halted by canister shot.  By 5 PM the fighting was over.

Aftermath

Unable to defend Chihuahua, Trias fled to Parras.  Doniphan commented, "The fire of our battery was so effective as to completely silence theirs."  Doniphan's men marched into Chihuahua on 2 March and on 23 April was ordered to bring his men to Saltillo, reaching Encantada on 21 May.

In popular culture
The Battle of the Sacramento River is mentioned in the 1985 Western novel Blood Meridian. While interred in a Chihuahua City prison, the main character of the book meets a veteran of the battle, who recounts its events.

See also
Battles of the Mexican–American War

Gallery

References

Further reading
   Brooks, N.C. Complete History Of The Mexican War: Grigg, Elliot & Co.Philadelphia 1849, pp.271-280
 Listing of 1846–1848 US Army Casualties

External links
Col. Doniphan's report of the battle
Marker to Doniphan in Clay Co., MO. - Missouri "Mormon" Frontier Foundation. - John Whitmer Historical Association.
Doniphan biography. - Kansas "bogus legislature" website.
Doniphan. - Columbia Encyclopedia.
Speaking of History Podcast with audio of John Dillingham speech on the life of Alexander Doniphan. - presented at the Truman Presidential Library in May 2007.
A Continent Divided: The U.S. - Mexico War, Center for Greater Southwestern Studies, the University of Texas at Arlington

Sacramento River
February 1847 events
Sacramento River